Georgios Reppas (born 11 December 1974) is a Greek water polo player who competed in the 2000 Summer Olympics, in the 2004 Summer Olympics, and in the 2008 Summer Olympics.

See also
 Greece men's Olympic water polo team records and statistics
 List of men's Olympic water polo tournament goalkeepers
 List of World Aquatics Championships medalists in water polo

References

External links
 

1974 births
Living people
Greek male water polo players
Water polo goalkeepers
Olympic water polo players of Greece
Panathinaikos Water Polo Club players
Water polo players at the 2000 Summer Olympics
Water polo players at the 2004 Summer Olympics
Water polo players at the 2008 Summer Olympics
World Aquatics Championships medalists in water polo
Water polo players from Athens
21st-century Greek people